Da Ruan (September 10, 1960 – July 31, 2011) was a Chinese-Belgian mathematician, scientist, professor. He had a Ph.D. from Ghent University.

Bibliography
Fuzzy set theory and advanced mathematical applications (1995, Kluwer Academic Publishers)

References

1960 births
2011 deaths
Belgian mathematicians
Educators from Shanghai
Mathematicians from Shanghai
Ghent University alumni